Gemophos tinctus, the tinted cantharus, painted cantharus, or gaudy lesser whelk, is a species of sea snail in the family Pisaniidae.

Description
The size of the shell varies between 19 mm and 32 mm.

Distribution
This marine species occurs in the Gulf of Mexico, the Caribbean Sea and off the Lesser Antilles; in the Atlantic Ocean off North Carolina, USA.

References

 Redfern, C. (2001) Bahamian Seashells a Thousand Species from Abaco, Bahamas. Bahamian Seashells, Boca Raton, Florida, ix + 280 pp., 124 pls.
 Rosenberg, G., F. Moretzsohn, and E. F. García. 2009. Gastropoda (Mollusca) of the Gulf of Mexico, pp. 579–699 in Felder, D.L. and D.K. Camp (eds.), Gulf of Mexico–Origins, Waters, and Biota. Biodiversity. Texas A&M Press, College Station, Texas

Pisaniidae
Gastropods described in 1846